"There Goes Another Love Song" is a song by the American Southern rock band Outlaws. Written by Hughie Thomasson and Monte Yoho, it is the opening track and lead single from the band's 1975 debut album Outlaws. It became a Top 40 hit, peaking at number 34 on the Billboard Hot 100, and peaked at #30 in November 1975 in the Netherlands.

Background and composition
The song was written by Hughie Thomasson and Monte Yoho.  Thomasson's voice is the one commonly associated with the group because he sang two of the band's most popular songs, "There Goes Another Love Song" and "Green Grass and High Tides".

Release and reception
The song was generally well received by music critics. Ronnie D. Lankford, Jr. of Allmusic called it one of The Outlaws' best songs, while the Associated Press called it a "rock anthem". However, not all reviews were positive. Marley Brant was confused as to why the song was released as a single in the first place, as he thought it was "slightly inconsequential".

Other versions
"There Goes Another Love Song" was included on the various artists compilation The South's Greatest Hits.

Track listing
7" Vinyl
"There Goes Another Love Song" (Thomasson, Yoho) – 3:06
"Keep Prayin'" (O'Keefe) – 2:46

Personnel
Hughie Thomasson - lead guitar, vocals
Billy Jones - lead guitar, vocals
Monte Yoho - drums
Frank O'Keefe - bass guitar
Henry Paul - electric and acoustic guitar, vocals

Chart performance

Notes

References

1975 debut singles
Outlaws (band) songs
Song recordings produced by Paul A. Rothchild
Songs written by Hughie Thomasson
1975 songs
Arista Records singles